The 13th Gold Cup was a motor race, run to Formula One rules, held on 17 September 1966 at Oulton Park, England. The race was run over 40 laps of the circuit, and was won by Australian driver Jack Brabham in a Brabham BT19.

The race ended in a very close finish, with Denny Hulme crossing the line a fraction of a second behind Brabham. Hulme was driving a slightly newer Brabham model, the BT20. 

This was John Campbell-Jones' last appearance in a Formula One race.

Results

References

 Results at Silhouet.com 
 Results at F1 Images.de 

International Gold Cup
International Gold Cup
Gold
International Gold Cup